Ole Hansen (1855–1928) was a Danish politician, farmer and Minister for Agriculture in the Cabinet of Deuntzer and the Cabinet of J.C. Christensen I as a member of the Venstre Reform Party.

He was the first farmer to become a Danish minister.

He was a member of Folketinget from 1890 to 1908 and of the Landsting from 1914 to 1928. In 1922 he became the president of Landstinget.

1855 births
1928 deaths
Agriculture ministers of Denmark
Speakers of the Landsting (Denmark)
Governors of the Bank of Denmark
Members of the Folketing